Anthem Preparatory Academy is a public charter elementary/high school in north Phoenix, Arizona. It is operated by Great Hearts Academies. It is a member of the Arizona Interscholastic Association.

Public high schools in Arizona
Educational institutions established in 2009
High schools in Phoenix, Arizona
Charter schools in Arizona
2009 establishments in Arizona